Berezhki is a rural locality (a village) in Zhukovsky District, Bryansk Oblast, Russia. The population was 17 as of 2010. There is 1 street.

Geography 
Berezhki is located 19 km north of Zhukovka (the district's administrative centre) by road. Priyutino is the nearest rural locality.

References 

Rural localities in Zhukovsky District, Bryansk Oblast